Binhe Subdistrict is a subdistrict in the southern side of Pinggu District, Beijing, China. It borders Xinggu Subdistrict in its north, and is surrounded by Pinggu Town in all other directions. As of 2020, its population was 50,541. This subdistrict was formed in 2002, and its name can be translated as "Shore River".

Administrative divisions 
In the year 2021, Binhe Subdistrict comprised 15 residential communities. They are listed as follows:

See also 

 List of township-level divisions of Beijing

References 

Pinggu District
Subdistricts of Beijing